Anahat (Unhurt) is a 2003 Marathi film directed by Amol Palekar and starring Anant Nag, Sonali Bendre and Deepti Naval. Anahat Best Artistic Direction award Won at World Film Festival of Bangkok, 2003

Anahat was screened as the opening film of the 2003 Indian Panorama, an International film festival. It was also screened at Jerusalem Film Festival in 2011 along with five other movies.

Plot
Anahat is set in the 10th century AD in Shravasti, the capital of the Kingdom of Malla. It revolves around two individuals — the king of Malla (Anant Nag), who is unable to father an heir, and the Queen, Sheelavati (Sonali Bendre), who is forced to choose a potent mate for one night. But, while the queen is ordered to merely produce an heir through the prevalent custom of Niyoga, she enjoys the sexual act without hurting her husband and comes to realise what her life was missing (in terms of sexual fulfillment).

Reception 
Pankaj Upadhyaya of Rediff wrote that "In the final reckoning, it's a simple story simply told. The camera works efficiently. The actors, for the most part, have just been allowed to be themselves"

References

External links
 
 

2003 films
2000s Marathi-language films
Indian films based on plays
Films set in the 10th century
Films set in Uttar Pradesh
History of India on film
Films directed by Amol Palekar
Indian historical drama films
2000s historical drama films
2003 drama films